Conrad-Albert-Charles d'Ursel, 1st Duke d'Ursel and Hoboken (10 February 1665 – 3 May 1738) was a Dutch nobleman and general.

Biography
Conrad-Albert was born in Brussels to François, 2nd Count of Ursel. During his childhood, his father purchased the rank of captain for him. He fought under the service of Leopold I during the Great Turkish War. He also served in the Spanish army; he was appointed general of the armies in 1696. In 1704, Conrad-Albert was appointed Grand Bailiff of Hainault.

In 1713, Conrad-Albert married Eléonore, Princess of Salm, in Roermond; as a gift for the marriage, he was gifted the title Baron of Wesemael by Charles-Hubert-Augustin Schetz, his cousin. Conrad-Albert and Eléonore had two children, Charles, 2nd Duke d'Ursel and Benoite-Charlotte, Count d'Ursel.

In August 1716, Conrad-Albert was created Duke of Ursel; he was created Duke of Hoboken the following year. In 1718, he was appointed governor of Namur, though this officially occurred in 1732. After the death of Charles-Hubert-Augustin Schetz in 1726, he inherited the title Lord of Wesemael, making him Hereditary Marshal of Brabant.

References

1665 births
1738 deaths
Duke d'Ursel
Nobility from Brussels